Idun (1955-1979) was an American Thoroughbred Champion racehorse who won U.S. Champion 2 and 3-year-old filly honors.

Sired by Royal Charger, a son of the very important sire Nearco, Idun was owned by Josephine Bay, wife of Charles Ulrick Bay, business executive and the United States Ambassador to Norway from 1946 to 1953. The filly was ridden by future Hall of Fame jockey Bill Hartack and trained by another future Hall of Famer, Sherrill W. Ward who would later condition Forego.

Pedigree

External links
 Idun's pedigree and racing stats

References

1955 racehorse births
1979 racehorse deaths
American Champion racehorses
Racehorses bred in Kentucky
Racehorses trained in the United States
Thoroughbred family 4-m